is a formula racing series held in Japan regulated according to FIA Formula 4 regulations. The inaugural season was held in 2015.

History
Gerhard Berger and the FIA Singleseater Commission launched the FIA Formula 4 in March 2013. The goal of the Formula 4 is to make the ladder to Formula 1 more transparent. Besides sporting and technical regulations, costs are regulated too. A car to compete in this category may not exceed €30.000 in purchase. A single season in Formula 4 may not exceed €100.000 in costs. The Japanese F4 will be the one of the second phase Formula 4 championship to be launched. The first phase championships was the Italian F4 Championship and the Formula 4 Sudamericana which started in 2014.

The F4 Japanese Championship was launched by the GT Association on 16 December 2014. All rounds are support events to the Super GT. 

Japanese race car constructor Dome was contracted to design and build all the cars. The cars are constructed out of carbon fibre and feature a monocoque chassis. The engine is a 2.0 TOM'S Toyota,  whereas Dunlop (Sumitomo Rubber Industries) is the tyre supplier.

Point system

Champions
All teams and drivers were Japanese-registered.

Drivers

Teams

Independent Cup

Circuits 

 Bold denotes a circuit will be used in the 2023 season.

Notes

References

External links
 

 
Formula racing series
Recurring sporting events established in 2015
Auto racing series in Japan
Formula 4 series
2015 establishments in Japan